Phyllostachys kwangsiensis  is a species of bamboo found in Guangxi, China

References

External links
 
 

kwangsiensis
Flora of China